, there were about 18,500 electric vehicles in Tennessee.

Government policy
, the state government charges a $100 registration fee for electric vehicles.

Charging stations
, there 23 DC charging station locations in Tennessee.

The Infrastructure Investment and Jobs Act, signed into law in November 2021, allocates  to charging stations in Tennessee.

Manufacturing
Tennessee is widely considered to be a potential national hub for electric vehicle manufacturing.

References

Tennessee
Road transportation in Tennessee